Mount Hubbard is one of the major mountains of the Saint Elias Range. It is located on the Alaska/Yukon border; the Canadian side is within Kluane National Park and Reserve, and the American side is part of Wrangell–St. Elias National Park. The mountain was named in 1890 by U.S. Geological Survey geologist Israel Russell after Gardiner Greene Hubbard, first president of the National Geographic Society, which had co-sponsored Russell's expedition.

Hubbard is the highest point of a large massif with three named summits; the other two are Mount Alverstone and Mount Kennedy. The Hubbard Glacier separates Mount Hubbard from Mount Vancouver to the west, while the Lowell Glacier lies to the east of the peak.

Mount Hubbard is the eighth-highest peak in the United States, and the twelfth-highest peak in Canada. It is also notable for its large rise above local terrain. However, despite its precipitous drops to the west, the eastern side provides a non-technical (though long) route to the summit.


See also

List of mountain peaks of North America
List of mountain peaks of Canada
List of mountain peaks of the United States
List of Boundary Peaks of the Alaska-British Columbia/Yukon border

Notes
  Both of these use a prominence cutoff of 300 metres; different cutoffs are often used, see e.g. the List of United States fourteeners.

References

External links

 Mount Hubbard on bivouac.com
 
 A list of Yukon mountains by prominence
 "Mount Hubbard, Yukon Territory/Alaska" on Peakbagger

Four-thousanders of Yukon
Mountains of Alaska
Saint Elias Mountains
Mountains of Yakutat City and Borough, Alaska
Wrangell–St. Elias National Park and Preserve
Kluane National Park and Reserve
Canada–United States border
International mountains of North America
Mount Hubbard